The Mussau monarch (Symposiachrus menckei), also known as the white-breasted monarch, is a species of bird in the family Monarchidae. It is endemic to the Bismarck Archipelago of Papua New Guinea.  Its natural habitats are subtropical or tropical moist lowland forests and rural gardens.  It is threatened by habitat loss.

Taxonomy and systematics
The Mussau monarch was originally placed in the genus Monarcha until moved to Symposiachrus in 2009. Alternate names include Mencke's monarch, Mussau Island monarch, Mussau pied monarch and St. Matthias monarch. The species name is after Bruno Mencke who supported the expedition on which the species was collected by Oskar Heinroth.

References

Mussau monarch
Birds of New Ireland Province
Mussau monarch
Taxonomy articles created by Polbot